William Leong Jee Keen (born 27 January 1957) is a Malaysian politician who has served as the Member of Parliament (MP) for Selayang since March 2008 and Chair of the Major Public Appointments Select Committee since December 2018. He is a member of the People's Justice Party (PKR), a component party of the Pakatan Harapan (PH) opposition coalition. He has also served as the Treasurer-General of PKR since July 2022.

Personal life
Leong is also a lawyer, and has three children.

Political career
Leong was elected to Parliament in the 2008 Malaysian general election, winning the seat of Selayang from the ruling Barisan Nasional (BN) coalition.

Election results

See also
Major Public Appointments Select Committee
Selayang (federal constituency)

References

20th-century Malaysian lawyers
Living people
Members of the Dewan Rakyat
People's Justice Party (Malaysia) politicians
1957 births
Malaysian politicians of Chinese descent
People from Perak
21st-century Malaysian lawyers